Yard goat can refer to:

 A slang term for a terminal tractor, used to tow trailers around a warehouse or yard
 A slang term for a switcher, which serves a similar function as a terminal tractor but is used on railcars
 The Hartford Yard Goats, a minor league baseball team.